A lesson is a structured period of time where learning is intended to occur.

Lesson or lessons may also refer to:

 a reading from scripture also known as a lection

Literature
 The Lesson a one-act play by Eugène Ionesco
 "The Lesson" (short story), a short story by Toni Cade Bambara
 Lessons, a 2022 novel by Ian McEwan

People
Fred Lessons (1883–1918), English footballer and manager
Luka Lesson, Australian slam poet
René Lesson (1794–1849), French surgeon, naturalist, ornithologist and herpetologist

Film and TV
 The Lesson (1917 film) directed by Charles Giblyn
 The Lesson (1987 film), a Soviet science fiction short film
 The Lesson (2014 Bulgarian film), a Bulgarian-Greek film
 The Lesson (2014 Latvian film), a Latvian film

TV
 "Lessons" (Buffy the Vampire Slayer), an episode of Buffy the Vampire Slayer
 "Lessons" (Max Headroom), an episode of Max Headroom (TV series)
 "Lessons" (The Wire), a first-season episode of the HBO original series, The Wire
 "Lessons" (Star Trek: The Next Generation), an episode of Star Trek: The Next Generation
 "The Lesson" (TMNT 2003 Episode), the sixty-fifth episode of the animated series Teenage Mutant Ninja Turtles

Music
 Lessons, album by Shadows Chasing Ghosts
 Lessons, album by Ha Ha Tonka (band)
 Lessons, album by Sohn (musician)
 Lessons (album), a 2015 album by Caponne-N-Noreaga
 "Lessons", a song by Rush, from their 1976 album 2112
 "The Lesson" (song), recorded by Vikki Carr in 1967
"The Lesson", a song by Victor Wooten, featured on his 2008 album Palmystery

See also
 Lesson No.1 (disambiguation)
 Lection, a public reading, especially of a passage from the Bible
 Private Lessons (disambiguation)